R.E. Chisholm Architects, Inc. is a full-service architectural, interior design and urban design firm located in Miami, Florida. It was founded in 1982 by Robert E. Chisholm, FAIA.   The firm was known as CSR Architects from 1983 through 1989.  In 1989, the firm was incorporated and grew to its current status.  Robert E. Chisholm originally adopted the firm philosophy of maintaining a variety of project types and experience which would develop the thinking and attitude of the firm in a consistent direction of architects in responsible leadership of each project.  Chisholm Architects has designed numerous projects which include offices, restaurants, theaters, schools, university facilities, medical centers, commercial & retail sites, institutional & cultural centers, single and multi-unit residences, rapid transit stations, and aviation facilities.  In 1996 Robert E. Chisholm was named Fellow of the American Institute of Architects,  the highest honor attainable in this 150-year-old organization and in 2007, Mr. Chisholm was awarded the State of Florida AIA Silver Medal for Architecture.

Projects

Commercial 
 Beachcomber Hotel, Miami Beach, Florida (1997)
 Capital Investments, Coral Gables, Florida (2006)
 Century Partners, Doral, Florida (2007)
 Cuban Exile History Museum and Library, Miami, Florida (Design Stage, 2012)
 Doral Branch and Executive HQ for US Century Bank, Doral, Florida (2007)
 Hapimag Hotel, Coral Gables, Florida (2001)
 Gables Waterway, Coral Gables, FLorida (Design Stage)
 La Posse, Miami, FLorida (1997)
 Los Ranchos Restaurants, Miami, Florida (1982-1992)
 Miller Branch for US Century Bank, Miami, Florida (2008)
 Tamarac Sports Complex, Tamarac, Florida (2008)

Institutional 
 Community Partners for the Homeless I, Homestead, Florida (1995)
 Community Partners for the Homeless II, Miami, Florida (1998)
 Coconut Grove Playhouse, Coconut Grove, Florida (2004)
 Everglades Farmworkers Village, Florida City, Florida (1991-Present)
 Miami International Airport Cargo Building, Miami, Florida (1994)
 New World School of the Arts, Miami, Florida (2000)
 Our Lady of Guadalupe, Doral, Florida (2009)
 Overtown Transit Center, Miami, Florida (2006)
 South Florida Regional Transportation Authority / Tri-Rail, Miami, Florida (2004)
 St. Augustine Catholic Church, Coral Gables, Florida (2010)
 St. Clara Rapid Transit, Miami-Dade County, FLorida (1983)
 St. Justin Martyr, Key Largo, Florida (1992)
 St. Monica, Miami Gardens, Florida (Design Statge)
 University of Miami Selevan Chapel, Miami, Florida (2010)

Residential 
 Cloisters at the Gables, Miami, Florida (2008)
 Everglades Farmworkers Village, Florida City, Florida (1991-Present)
 Faget Residence, Coral Gables, Florida (2003)
 Gables Waterway, Coral Gables, Florida (Design Stage)
 Mariners Cove, Key West, Florida (1994)
 Melrose Apartments, Miami, Florida (2010)
 Moreno Residence, Coral Gables, Florida (2007)
 The Oaks, Miami, Florida (2009)
 Our Lady of Guadalupe, Doral, Florida (2009)
 School House Road Luxury Residence, South Miami, Florida (2009)
 St. Monica, Miami Gardens, Florida (Design Statge)
 Suchman Residence, Coral Gables, Florida (1991)

Recent Awards 
 2002 - Historic Preservation Award, Dade Heritage Trust, Cuchiella Residence Homestead, Florida
 2004 - Miami-Dade College Hall of Fame/Architecture to Robert E. Chisholm, FAIA, NCARB
 2004 - American Institute of Architects, Charles W. Clary Government Service Award
 2005 - Miami/American Institute of Architects, Silver Medal Award Government Service Award - Robert E. Chisholm, FAIA, NCARB
 2006 - Alvah H. Chapman Jr. Humanitarian, Award to Robert E. Chisholm, FAIA, NCARB
 2006 - March of Dimes Community Excellence Award – Architectural  and Engineering – Robert E. Chisholm, FAIA, NCARB
 2007 - Greater Miami Chamber of  Commerce, Top 100 Minority Business Awards, R.E. Chisholm Architects, Inc.
 2007 - Florida & Caribbean Association of the American Institute of Architects, Silver Medal Award for Architecture to Robert E. Chisholm, FAIA, NCARB
 2008 - Ronald McDonald House Twelve Good Men Award for Outstanding Community Service and Involvement to Robert E. Chisholm, FAIA, NCARB

See also 
List of architecture firms

References

External links 
 

Architecture firms based in Florida
Companies based in Miami